Rossia megaptera, also known as the big-fin bobtail squid, is a species of bobtail squid native to the northwestern Atlantic Ocean, specifically Davis Strait, western Greenland, and off New York, in Hudson Canyon. It lives at depths from 179 to 1,536 m. It can grow up to 41 mm in mantle length.

This type specimen was collected in the northwestern Atlantic Ocean and is deposited at the Peabody Museum of Natural History  in New Haven, Connecticut.

References

External links

Bobtail squid
Molluscs of North America
Molluscs of the Atlantic Ocean
Fauna of Greenland
Cephalopods described in 1881